Rakowiec may refer to the following places:
Rakowiec, Warsaw
Rakowiec, Kwidzyn County in Pomeranian Voivodeship (north Poland)
Rakowiec, Tczew County in Pomeranian Voivodeship (north Poland)
Rakowiec, Gostynin County in Masovian Voivodeship (east-central Poland)
Rakowiec, Siedlce County in Masovian Voivodeship (east-central Poland)
Rakówiec, Masovian Voivodeship (east-central Poland)